Carex longicruris is a tussock-forming species of perennial sedge in the family Cyperaceae. It is native to parts of Asia from Himalayas in the north to Sri Lanka in the south.

See also
List of Carex species

References

longicruris
Plants described in 1834
Taxa named by Christian Gottfried Daniel Nees von Esenbeck
Flora of Sri Lanka
Flora of Nepal
Flora of India